Marko Klok (born 14 March 1968 in Monnickendam, North Holland) is a volleyball player from the Netherlands, who represented his native country in two Summer Olympics, starting in 1992 in Barcelona, Spain. There he won the silver medal as a part of the Dutch Men's National Team, and later took ninth at the 2004 Summer Olympics in Athens, Greece.

In 1995, Klok and partner Michiel van der Kuip won the European beach volleyball title.

References
  Dutch Olympic Committee
 Database Olympics profile

1968 births
Living people
Dutch men's volleyball players
Dutch men's beach volleyball players
Volleyball players at the 1992 Summer Olympics
Volleyball players at the 2004 Summer Olympics
Olympic medalists in volleyball
Olympic silver medalists for the Netherlands
Olympic volleyball players of the Netherlands
People from Monnickendam

Medalists at the 1992 Summer Olympics
Sportspeople from North Holland
20th-century Dutch people